Squash at the 2001 Southeast Asian Games was held in Bukit Dumbar Squash Centre, Penang, Malaysia from 10 to 16 September 2001  Squash had team, and individual events for men and women.

Medalists

Medal table
Legend

References

External links
 

2001
2001 Southeast Asian Games events